Byrraju Sandhya Raju (born as Sri Sandhya Raja) is an Indian Kuchipudi dancer and actress. She is a student of Dr. Vempati Chinna Satyam, Chennai at Kuchipudi Art Academy. She made her acting debut in the 2013 Hindi short film Yaadhon Ki Baraat and feature film debut in the 2017 Malayalam thriller film titled Careful, which came shortly after her appearance in a short film titled Natyam (2016) which released on International Dance Day. She is the eldest child of Ramco Industries Chairman P. R. Venkatrama Raja and  married Rama Raju, son of the businessman Ramalinga Raju.

She founded Nishrinkala Dance Academy to impart her Guru's Kuchipudi to the next generation. She is the managing director of Sandhya Spinning Mills which is a part of the Ramco Group of Industries.

Early life 
Raju completed her primary education at Krishnamurti Foundation's The School KFI Chennai, her high school in Bala Vidya Mandir, Chennai and studied briefly at Loyola College, Chennai and  graduated from Osmania University with a Bachelor's degree in Psychology. She began her training as a Kuchipudi Dancer at the tender age of ten under Vempati Chinna Satyam at the Kuchipudi Art Academy which was next door to her house. She was also trained by prominent Kuchipudi Guru Kishore Mosalikanti. and completed her Rangapravesham under his guidance.

Career 
She made her Telugu film debut with Natyam. The film is said to be a romantic drama that revolves around various dance forms.

Kuchipudi 
Sandhya Raju has been performing Kuchipudi ever since she was a teenager. Her first performance was a small role in her Guru's Popular Dance Drama Ksheera Saagara Madhanam, which was staged in Rajapalayam. She continued to perform small roles in several of Vempati Chinna Satyam’s dance dramas. At the age of 15 Sandhya was selected to play the main role of Lord Krishna in his final Dance Drama Gopika Krishna. Sandhya toured the US with her Guru. Thereafter, Sandhya began her Training under Guru Shri Mosalikanti, who is a senior disciple of Vempati Chinna Satyam himself. Sandhya has performed for Guru Kishore Mosalikanti's ensemble on several occasions and finally debuted as a professional Solo performer at her Rangapravesham in Music Academy, Chennai. Her debut solo was highly appreciated by Ms. Leela Samson and Shri Chidambaram who graced the occasion. Sandhya has performed several solo Kuchipudi acts across India and the globe. Some of her prominent performances being that in Guimet Museum, Paris, International Museum of Vienna and her virtual performance for erasing Borders, NYC and two tours of South Africa. In India she has performed in the National Centre for the Performing Arts, Mumbai. Krishna Ghana Sabha, Narada Gana Sabha and Music Academy in Chennai. She has performed in her own home town of Rajapalayam for her great grandfather's annual birthday celebrations. Her live performances have been documented on YouTube. She has over 8 million views across her Kuchipudi videos, making her the highest viewed Kuchipudi performer on YouTube. Her most popular videos include her performance of Krishna Shabdam and Muddugare Yashodha.

Filmography

See also 
 Ramco Cements

References

External links 
 

Living people
Kuchipudi exponents
Indian female dancers
Actresses in Telugu cinema
Actresses in Malayalam cinema
Indian film actresses
Actresses from Chennai
21st-century Indian actresses
1982 births